George Louis Chuvalo, CM (born September 12, 1937 as Jure Čuvalo) is a Canadian former professional boxer who was a five-time Canadian heavyweight champion and two-time world heavyweight title challenger. He is known for having  never been  knocked down in his 93 bout professional career including fights against Muhammad Ali, Joe Frazier, and George Foreman. Chuvalo unsuccessfully challenged Muhammad  Ali for the heavyweight championship in 1966. Chuvalo was inducted into the Ontario Sports Hall of Fame in 1995.

Early life and career
Chuvalo was born on September 12, 1937 to Croat immigrants Stipan and Katica from Ljubuški in the Herzegovina region of what is today Bosnia and Herzegovina. Chuvalo became the Canadian amateur heavyweight champion in May 1955, defeating Winnipeg's Peter Piper with a first-round knockout (KO) in a tournament final in Regina, Saskatchewan. Chuvalo finished his amateur career with a 16–0 record, all by KO within four rounds. Nicknamed "Boom Boom", Chuvalo turned professional in 1956, knocking out four opponents in one night to win a heavyweight tournament held by former world champion Jack Dempsey at Maple Leaf Gardens in Toronto on April 26, 1956.

George Chuvalo's rankings as a heavyweight were: number 9 in 1963, number 5 in 1964, number 3 in 1965, number 8 in 1966, number 4 in 1968 and number 7 in 1970.

Against Ali
Chuvalo is best known for his two fights against Muhammad Ali. He went the distance both times, in each case losing the decision by a wide margin on the scorecards. The first fight, on March 29, 1966, at Toronto's Maple Leaf Gardens, was for Ali's world heavyweight title. "He's the toughest guy I ever fought", said Ali of Chuvalo after the fight.

Other notable contests 
George also had some losses against famous fighters other than his two losses to Ali. In 1957, George lost to Bob Baker, who was ranked as high as number two contender in 1955. This was his thirteenth fight and second professional loss. He also lost to Zora Folley, who was once ranked as the top contender. Among his victories was a win against Doug Jones, who gave Muhammad Ali a closely contested bout in 1963.

Tributes and other appearances
His 1966 match against Ali was the subject of Joseph Blasioli's 2003 documentary film The Last Round: Chuvalo vs. Ali.

On August 14, 2008, Chuvalo's kitchen was the featured renovation project on the Canadian TV series Holmes on Homes in an episode titled "Kitchen Knockout".

During April 2010, Chuvalo was a special guest at the BC Golden Gloves tournament held at the Eagle Ridge Community Centre in Langford, British Columbia.

On December 17, 2011, he travelled to Sarajevo to attend the unveiling of a statue in his honor in Ljubuški on December 18, 2011.

On May 11, 2019, the George Chuvalo Community Centre in Toronto, Ontario, opened which provide a variety of recreational programs for children as well as LGBTQ youth.

Professional boxing record

{| class="wikitable" style="text-align:center"
|-
!
!Result
!Record
!Opponent
!Type
!Round
!Date
!Location
!Notes
|- align=center
|93
|Win
|73–18–2
|align=left| George Jerome
|TKO
|3 (12)
|Dec 11, 1978
|align=left|
|align=left|
|- align=center
|92
|Win
|72–18–2
|align=left| Earl McLeay
|TKO
|1 (12)
|Dec 8, 1977
|align=left|
|align=left|
|- align=center
|91
|Win
|71–18–2
|align=left| Bob Felstein
|KO
|9 (12)
|Mar 7, 1977
|align=left|
|align=left|
|- align=center
|90
|Win
|70–18–2
|align=left| Mike Boswell
|KO
|7 (10)
|Oct 30, 1973
|align=left|
|align=left|
|- align=center
|89
|Win
|69–18–2
|align=left| Tony Ventura
|TKO
|3 (10)
|Sep 25, 1973
|align=left|
|align=left|
|- align=center
|88
|Win
|68–18–2
|align=left| Charlie Boston
|KO
|2 
|Sep 5, 1972
|align=left|
|align=left|
|- align=center
|87
|Win
|67–18–2
|align=left| Tommy Burns
|KO
|1 (12)
|Aug 10, 1972
|align=left|
|align=left|
|- align=center
|86
|Loss
|66–18–2
|align=left| Muhammad Ali
|UD
|12
|May 1, 1972
|align=left|
|align=left|
|- align=center
|85
|Win
|66–17–2
|align=left| Jim Christopher
|KO
|2 (10)
|Feb 21, 1972
|align=left|
|align=left|
|- align=center
|84
|Win
|65–17–2
|align=left| Charley Chase
|TKO
|6 (12)
|Jan 28, 1972
|align=left|
|align=left|
|- align=center
|83
|Win
|64–17–2
|align=left| Cleveland Williams
|UD
|10
|Nov 17, 1971
|align=left|
|
|- align=center
|82
|Loss
|63–17–2
|align=left| Jimmy Ellis
|UD
|10
|May 10, 1971
|align=left|
|align=left|
|- align=center
|81
|Win
|63–16–2
|align=left| Charles Couture
|KO
|2 (10)
|Dec 11, 1970
|align=left|
|align=left|
|- align=center
|80
|Win
|62–16–2
|align=left| Tony Ventura
|TKO
|4 (10)
|Nov 5, 1970
|align=left|
|align=left|
|- align=center
|79
|Win
|61–16–2
|align=left| Tommy Burns
|KO
|1 (12)
|Oct 24, 1970
|align=left|
|align=left|
|- align=center
|78
|Win
|60–16–2
|align=left| Mike Bruce
|KO
|2 (10)
|Aug 15, 1970
|align=left|
|align=left|
|- align=center
|77
|Loss
|59–16–2
|align=left| George Foreman
|TKO
|3 (10)
|Aug 4, 1970
|align=left|
|
|- align=center
|76
|Win
|59–15–2
|align=left| Charlie Reno
|KO
|3 (10)
|Jun 30, 1970
|align=left|
|
|- align=center
|75
|Win
|58–15–2
|align=left| Gino Ricci
|TKO
|1 (10)
|May 10, 1970
|align=left|
|align=left|
|- align=center
|74
|Win
|57–15–2
|align=left| Willie Tiger
|KO
|10 (10)
|May 1, 1970
|align=left|
|align=left|
|- align=center
|73
|Win
|56–15–2
|align=left| Jerry Quarry
|KO
|7 (10)
|Dec 12, 1969
|align=left|
|
|- align=center
|72
|Win
|55–15–2
|align=left| Leslie Borden
|TKO
|3 (10)
|Nov 16, 1969
|align=left|
|align=left|
|- align=center
|71
|Win
|54–15–2
|align=left| Stamford Harris
|TKO
|3 (12)
|Sep 8, 1969
|align=left|
|align=left|
|- align=center
|70
|Loss
|53–15–2
|align=left| Buster Mathis
|UD
|12
|Feb 3, 1969
|align=left|
|
|- align=center
|69
|Win
|53–14–2
|align=left| Dante Cane
|TKO
|7 (10)
|Nov 12, 1968
|align=left|
|align=left|
|- align=center
|68
|Win
|52–14–2
|align=left| Manuel Ramos
|TKO
|5 (10)
|Sep 26, 1968
|align=left|
|
|- align=center
|67
|Win
|51–14–2
|align=left| Vic Brown
|TKO
|3 (10)
|Sep 17, 1968
|align=left|
|
|- align=center
|66
|Win
|50–14–2
|align=left| Levi Forte
|TKO
|2 (10)
|Sep 3, 1968
|align=left|
|align=left|
|- align=center
|65
|Win
|49–14–2
|align=left| Johnny Featherman
|KO
|1 (12)
|Jun 30, 1968
|align=left|
|align=left|
|- align=center
|64
|Win
|48–14–2
|align=left| Jean-Claude Roy
|UD
|12
|Jun 5, 1968
|align=left|
|align=left|
|- align=center
|63
|Loss
|47–14–2
|align=left| Joe Frazier
|TKO
|4 (10)
|Jul 19, 1967
|align=left|
|align=left| 
|- align=center
|62
|Win
|47–13–2
|align=left| Archie Ray
|TKO
|2 (10)
|Jun 22, 1967
|align=left|
|align=left|
|- align=center
|61
|Win
|46–13–2
|align=left| Willi Besmanoff
|TKO
|3 (10)
|May 27, 1967
|align=left|
|align=left|
|- align=center
|60
|Win
|45–13–2
|align=left| Willi Besmanoff
|TKO
|3 (10)
|Apr 4, 1967
|align=left|
|align=left|
|- align=center
|59
|Win
|44–13–2
|align=left| Buddy Moore
|KO
|2 (10)
|Mar 20, 1967
|align=left|
|align=left|
|- align=center
|58
|Win
|43–13–2
|align=left| Dick Wipperman
|TKO
|3 (10)
|Feb 22, 1967
|align=left|
|
|- align=center
|57
|Win
|42–13–2
|align=left| Vic Brown
|KO
|4 (10)
|Jan 16, 1967
|align=left|
|align=left|
|- align=center
|56
|Win
|41–13–2
|align=left| Willie McCormick
|KO
|3 (10)
|Dec 16, 1966
|align=left|
|align=left|
|- align=center
|55
|Win
|40–13–2
|align=left| Dave Russell
|TKO
|2 (10)
|Nov 28, 1966
|align=left|
|align=left|
|- align=center
|54
|Win
|39–13–2
|align=left| Boston Jacobs
|TKO
|3 (10)
|Nov 21, 1966
|align=left|
|align=left|
|- align=center
|53
|Win
|38–13–2
|align=left| Dick Wipperman
|TKO
|5 (10)
|Oct 12, 1966
|align=left|
|align=left|
|- align=center
|52
|Win
|37–13–2
|align=left| Bob Avery
|TKO
|2 (15)
|Sep 15, 1966
|align=left|
|
|- align=center
|51
|Win
|36–13–2
|align=left| Mel Turnbow
|KO
|7 (10)
|Aug 16, 1966
|align=left|
|align=left|
|- align=center
|50
|Loss
|35–13–2
|align=left| Oscar Bonavena
|MD
|12
|Jun 23, 1966
|align=left|
|align=left|
|- align=center
|49
|Win
|35–12–2
|align=left| Levi Forte
|TKO
|2 (10)
|May 15, 1966
|align=left|
|
|- align=center
|48
|Loss
|34–12–2
|align=left| Muhammad Ali
|UD
|15
|Mar 29, 1966
|align=left|
|align=left|
|- align=center
|47
|Loss
|34–11–2
|align=left| Eduardo Corletti
|PTS
|10
|Jan 25, 1966
|align=left|
|align=left|
|- align=center
|46
|Win
|34–10–2
|align=left| Joe Bygraves
|
|10
|Dec 7, 1965
|align=left|
|
|- align=center
|45
|Loss
|33–10–2
|align=left| Ernie Terrell
|UD
|15
|Nov 1, 1965
|align=left|
|align=left|
|- align=center
|44
|Win
|33–9–2
|align=left| Orvin Veazey
|KO
|2 (10)
|Aug 17, 1965
|align=left|
|align=left|
|- align=center
|43
|Win
|32–9–2
|align=left| Dave Bailey
|KO
|3 (10)
|Jun 30, 1965
|align=left|
|align=left|
|- align=center
|42
|Win
|31–9–2
|align=left| Ed Sonny Andrews
|TKO
|1 (10)
|Jun 7, 1965
|align=left|
|align=left|
|- align=center
|41
|Win
|30–9–2
|align=left| Bill Nielsen
|TKO
|8 (10)
|Apr 19, 1965
|align=left|
|align=left|
|- align=center
|40
|Loss
|29–9–2
|align=left| Floyd Patterson
|UD
|12
|Feb 1, 1965
|align=left|
|
|- align=center
|39
|Win
|29–8–2
|align=left| Calvin Butler
|KO
|3 (10)
|Nov 10, 1964
|align=left|
|align=left|
|- align=center
|38
|Win
|28–8–2
|align=left| Doug Jones
|TKO
|11 (12)
|Oct 2, 1964
|align=left|
|
|- align=center
|37
|Win
|27–8–2
|align=left| Don Prout
|TKO
|3 (10)
|Jul 27, 1964
|align=left|
|align=left|
|- align=center
|36
|Win
|26–8–2
|align=left| Hugh Mercier
|KO
|1 (12)
|Mar 18, 1964
|align=left|
|align=left|
|- align=center
|35
|Loss
|25–8–2
|align=left| Zora Folley
|UD
|10
|Jan 17, 1964
|align=left|
|
|- align=center
|34
|style="background:#abcdef;"|Draw
|25–7–2
|align=left| Tony Alongi
|PTS
|10
|Nov 8, 1963
|align=left|
|align=left|
|- align=center
|33
|Win
|25–7–1
|align=left| Mike DeJohn
| 
|10
|Sep 27, 1963
|align=left|
|
|- align=center
|32
|Win
|24–7–1
|align=left| Lloyd Washington
|KO
|2 (10)
|May 18, 1963
|align=left|
|align=left|
|- align=center
|31
|Win
|23–7–1
|align=left| Chico Gardner
|KO
|4 (10)
|Apr 29, 1963
|align=left|
|align=left|
|- align=center
|30
|Win
|22–7–1
|align=left| James Wakefield
|TKO
|6 (10)
|Apr 22, 1963
|align=left|
|align=left|
|- align=center
|29
|Win
|21–7–1
|align=left| Rico Brooks
|TKO
|2 (10)
|Mar 15, 1963
|align=left|
|align=left|
|- align=center
|28
|Loss
|20–7–1
|align=left| Joe Erskine
|
|5 (12)
|Oct 2, 1961
|align=left|
|align=left|
|- align=center
|27
|Loss
|20–6–1
|align=left| Bob Cleroux
|SD
|12
|Aug 8, 1961
|align=left|
|align=left|
|- align=center
|26
|Win
|20–5–1
|align=left| Willi Besmanoff
|TKO
|4 (10)
|Jun 27, 1961
|align=left|
|align=left|
|- align=center
|25
|Win
|19–5–1
|align=left| Alex Miteff
|SD
|10
|Mar 27, 1961
|align=left|
|align=left|
|- align=center
|24
|Win
|18–5–1
|align=left| Bob Cleroux
|UD
|12
|Nov 23, 1960
|align=left|
|align=left|
|- align=center
|23
|Loss
|17–5–1
|align=left| Bob Cleroux
|SD
|12
|Aug 17, 1960
|align=left|
|align=left|
|- align=center
|22
|Loss
|17–4–1
|align=left| Pete Rademacher
|UD
|10
|Jul 19, 1960
|align=left|
|align=left|
|- align=center
|21
|Win
|17–3–1
|align=left| Yvon Durelle
|KO
|12 (12)
|Nov 17, 1959
|align=left|
|align=left|
|- align=center
|20
|Win
|16–3–1
|align=left| Frankie Daniels
|TKO
|7 (10)
|Sep 14, 1959
|align=left|
|align=left|
|- align=center
|19
|Loss
|15–3–1
|align=left| Pat McMurtry
|UD
|10
|Oct 17, 1958
|align=left|
|align=left|
|- align=center
|18
|Win
|15–2–1
|align=left| James J. Parker
|KO
|1 (12)
|Sep 15, 1959
|align=left|
|align=left|
|- align=center
|17
|Draw
|14–2–1
|align=left| Alex Miteff
|
|10
|Jun 16, 1958
|align=left|
|
|- align=center
|16
|Win
|14–2
|align=left| Howard King
|KO
|2 (10)
|Apr 21, 1958
|align=left|
|align=left|
|- align=center
|15
|Win
|13–2
|align=left| Julio Mederos
|UD
|10
|Jan 27, 1958
|align=left|
|
|- align=center
|14
|Loss
|12–2
|align=left| Bob Baker
|UD
|10
|Sep 9, 1957
|align=left|
|align=left|
|- align=center
|13
|Win
|12–1
|align=left| Joe Schmolze
|KO
|4 (10)
|Jun 6, 1957
|align=left|
|
|- align=center
|12
|Win
|11–1
|align=left| Emil Brtko
|TKO
|2 (10)
|Apr 22, 1957
|align=left|
|align=left|
|- align=center
|11
|Win
|10–1
|align=left| Moses Graham
|KO
|2 (8)
|Mar 25, 1957
|align=left|
|align=left|
|- align=center
|10
|Win
|9–1
|align=left| Walter Hafer
|KO
|3 (8)
|Mar 4, 1957
|align=left|
|align=left|
|- align=center
|9
|Win
|8–1
|align=left| Sid Russell
|KO
|1 (8)
|Jan 14, 1957
|align=left|
|align=left|
|- align=center
|8
|Win
|7–1
|align=left| Bob Biehler
|UD
|8
|Nov 19, 1956
|align=left|
|align=left|
|- align=center
|7
|Loss
|6–1
|align=left| Howard King
|
|8
|Oct 22, 1956
|align=left|
|align=left|
|- align=center
|6
|Win
|6–0
|align=left| Joe Evans
|KO
|1 (8)
|Sep 10, 1956
|align=left|
|align=left|
|- align=center
|5
|Win
|5–0
|align=left| John Arthur
| 
|8
|Jun 11, 1956
|align=left|
|align=left|
|- align=center
|4
|Win
|4–0
|align=left| Ed McGee
|KO
|1 (3)
|Apr 23, 1956
|align=left|
|align=left|
|- align=center
|3
|Win
|3–0
|align=left| Ross Gregory
|KO
|1 (3)
|Apr 23, 1956
|align=left|
|align=left|
|- align=center
|2
|Win
|2–0
|align=left| Jim Leonard
|
|2 (3)
|Apr 23, 1956
|align=left|
|align=left|
|- align=center
|1
|Win
|1–0 
|align=left| Gordon Baldwin
| 
|2 
|Apr 23, 1956
|align=left|
|align=left|
|- align=center

References

 Chuvalo, George (November 2013). "Lost Boys". Toronto Life Magazine.

External links

Džordž (Jure) Čuvalo, najbolji kanadski bokser svih vremena: Nikad na kolenima – Tačno.net
George Chuvalo's Official Fight Against Drugs Website
 
CBC Digital Archives – Still Standing: The People's Champion George Chuvalo
Historica.ca – Footprints – George Chuvalo
Ian Palmer's TigerBoxing article on Chuvalo
The Canadian Encyclopedia
Cyber Boxing Zone Encyclopedia
CBC Digital Archives. The Biggest Fight of George Chuvalo's Life

1937 births
Living people
Canadian male boxers
Canadian people of Bosnia and Herzegovina descent
Canadian people of Croatian descent
Heavyweight boxers
Members of the Order of Canada
Boxers from Toronto